Lisa Fattah (1941–1992) was a German-born artist of Swedish descent who lived and worked in Iraq.

Life and career

Fattah studied at the Accademia di Belle Arti di Roma graduating in 1963 and the Real Academia de Bellas Artes de San Fernando in Madrid. While she was in Rome, she met Iraqi artist Ismail Fattah, who she later married. After her studies concluded, she moved to Baghdad.

She died in Baghdad in 1992.

Work
Her work often expresses her anger at the violence experienced by the Iraqi people.   Her painting Aggression was included in the exhibition Breaking the Veils: Women Artists from the Islamic World. It is now held in the collection of the Jordan National Gallery of Fine Arts.

See also
 Islamic art
 Iraqi art
 List of Iraqi artists

References 

1941 births
1992 deaths
German women painters
German people of Swedish descent
Iraqi contemporary artists
Iraqi painters
Iraqi women painters